Parapholis is a genus of Eurasian and North African plants in the grass family.

Species

Parapholis filiformis (Roth) C.E.Hubb. - from Madeira to Turkey
Parapholis gracilis Bor - Caucasus, Iraq, Iran, Jordan, and Israel.
Parapholis incurva (L.) C.E.Hubb. - from England + Canary Islands to Tajikistan; naturalised in Australia, New Zealand, scattered sites in North + South America
Parapholis marginata Runemark - from Morocco + Balearic Islands to Turkey
Parapholis pycnantha (Hack.) C.E.Hubb. - from Canary Islands to Turkey
Parapholis strigosa (Dumort.) C.E.Hubb. - from Ireland + Denmark to Libya

References 

Pooideae
Poaceae genera
Taxa named by Charles Edward Hubbard